Mount Mohican, or Raccoon Ridge, is a peak of the Kittatinny Mountains in Warren County, New Jersey, United States. The mountain stands  in height. It lies along the Appalachian Trail in Worthington State Forest.

References

External links

 Worthington State Forest

Mountains of New Jersey
Kittatinny Mountains
Mountains of Warren County, New Jersey